Charles Edwin George Adams (10 April 1897 – 16 September 1986) was an Australian rules footballer who played with Port Adelaide in the SAFL during the 1920s.

The 1921 season was the highlight of Adam's career, he played in a premiership side with Port Adelaide, won their best and fairest award and tied for the Magarey Medal. He lost the Magarey in a count-back but was awarded it retrospectively in 1998. Adams also won Port Adelaide's best and fairest award in 1920 and finished his senior career with 94 games to his name.

References

External links
Australian Football.com profile
SA Memory.gov

1897 births
Australian rules footballers from South Australia
Port Adelaide Football Club (SANFL) players
Port Adelaide Football Club players (all competitions)
Magarey Medal winners
1986 deaths